Wang Anshun (born December 1957) is a Chinese politician who served as Mayor of Beijing between 2012 and 2016, the 15th person to hold the office under Communist Party rule. Wang began his career in geological exploration, then made the transition into politics, serving in Gansu, Shanghai, and Beijing through his career.

Early life and education
Wang was born in Huixian, Henan Province, in 1957. He attended the Wuhan College of Geology. Wang also obtained a master's degree in economics from Nankai University.

Career 
Wang joined the Chinese Communist Party in March 1984. He began to work in the petroleum industry and was in charge of oil exploration in northeastern Jilin Province, before obtaining his master's degree at Nankai.

From July 1999 to September 2001, Wang worked in the Communist Party Committee of Gansu Province as head of the provincial organization department.  Wang was transferred to Shanghai in September 2001, and, in April 2003, he was promoted to the position of Deputy Party Secretary of Shanghai.  In March 2007, he was transferred to the same position in Beijing, and, in January 2011, he additionally became chairman of the People's Political Consultative Conference of Beijing.

In July 2012, Wang's predecessor Guo Jinlong resigned from his position as Mayor of Beijing, and Wang Anshun was appointed mayor in his place. It is not clear how Wang won favour over the years to take on what was evidently the most important mayoralty in China; Wang Qishan and Liu Qi had both held the position, prior to their ascendancy to the Politburo. Initially, Chinese-language media speculated that Wang's candidacy was advocated by Wen Jiabao, with whom Wang shared a background in geology. Wang, who was a relatively youthful 55 at the time of his appointment, seemed destined for the coveted Beijing party chief position.

On 28 January 2013, he was duly elected Mayor of Beijing by the Municipal People's Congress.  Wang's term lasted just over four years, during which assisted in Beijing's successful bid for the 2022 Winter Olympics. On 30 October 2016, Wang resigned as mayor of Beijing, revealing that he was being transferred to another position. Wang was succeeded by Cai Qi, an ally of Xi Jinping. Wang was transferred to the Development Research Center of the State Council.

Wang was an alternate member of the 17th Central Committee of the Chinese Communist Party, and a member of the 18th Central Committee.

References 

1957 births
Living people
Politicians from Xinxiang
Nankai University alumni
Mayors of Beijing
Chinese Communist Party politicians from Henan
People's Republic of China politicians from Henan
Political office-holders in Shanghai
Political office-holders in Gansu
People from Huixian